Mattituck is a hamlet and census-designated place (CDP) in Suffolk County, New York, United States. The population was 4,219 at the 2010 census.

Located in the Town of Southold, Mattituck CDP roughly corresponds to the hamlet by the same name.

History 
Mattituck is believed to have derived its name from the Algonquian name for "Great Creek". Mattituck Creek has been dredged and is used extensively by pleasure craft on Long Island Sound (the Mattituck Inlet is the entrance into Mattituck Creek, and the whole waterway is now popularly referred to as Mattituck Inlet).

It is only one of two harbors (the other being Mt. Sinai harbor) on the north side of Long Island on the Sound east of Port Jefferson.

The Mattituck Inlet and James Creek (which has also been dredged for boats) on the Peconic Bay come within  of each other and would provide a shortcut between the Peconic and Sound through the North Fork if connected via a canal. However, authorities have resisted the connection, fearing an ecological disaster. Still, the inlet is blamed for coastal erosion because it interrupts the longshore drift on the sound.

Corchaug Indians, who were the first residents of the area, sold land to Theophilus Eaton, governor of New Haven, Connecticut. The area was eventually settled by English colonists. The meadowlands were held in common by the residents of Southold from its founding in 1640. The town of Southold was established by Charter to the New Haven Colony of Connecticut in 1658. The woodlands were also held in common until 1661, when that land was divided among individual proprietors.

Mattituck was occupied by British troops during the Revolutionary War and Governor Tryon visited.

Mattituck hosts an annual Strawberry Festival and is located in the heart of over 30 vineyards in the Long Island Wine Region. The festival is usually held on Father's Day weekend every year.

Geography

Demographics

Demographics of the CDP
As of the census of 2000, there were 4,198 people, 1,651 households, and 1,231 families residing in the CDP. The population density was 485.7 per square mile (187.6/km2). There were 2,313 housing units at an average density of 267.6/sq mi (103.4/km2). The racial makeup of the hamlet was 96.62% White, 1.17% African American, 0.02% Native American, 0.52% Asian, 0.64% from other races, and 1.02% from two or more races. Hispanic or Latino of any race were 2.55% of the population.

There were 1,651 households, out of which 31.9% had children under the age of 18 living with them, 62.4% were married couples living together, 9.4% had a female householder with no husband present, and 25.4% were non-families. 21.8% of all households were made up of individuals, and 12.2% had someone living alone who was 65 years of age or older. The average household size was 2.53 and the average family size was 2.97.

In the community, the population was spread out, with 23.2% under the age of 18, 5.6% from 18 to 24, 25.0% from 25 to 44, 27.1% from 45 to 64, and 19.1% who were 65 years of age or older. The median age was 42 years. For every 100 females, there were 92.9 males. For every 100 females age 18 and over, there were 88.9 males.

The median income for a household in the hamlet was $55,353, and the median income for a family was $63,370. Males had a median income of $42,917 versus $34,813 for females. The per capita income for the CDP was $26,101. About 4.5% of families and 5.6% of the population were below the poverty line, including 5.7% of those under age 18 and 9.6% of those age 65 or over.

Mattituck-Cutchogue Union Free School District is attended by residents of Mattituck, Cutchogue and Laurel. The sports teams' name is the Tuckers.

Notable people
 Josephine Silone Yates (1852-1912), born in Mattituck, first African American woman to head a college science department, Lincoln University in Jefferson City, Missouri
 John Bunyan Reeve (1831-1916), born in Mattituck, minister, professor that organized Howard University's Theology department and social activist. Uncle of Josephine Silone Yates
 James Aldrich (1810–1866), born in Mattituck, noted poet and journalist
 William Lynch, Jr. (1941–2013), born in Mattituck, former New York City Deputy Mayor and political strategist
 Greg Sacks (1952) NASCAR Driver
 Cory Stearns (1985) Principal Dancer, American Ballet Theatre

See also
 Mattituck Airport

References

External links 

Southold, New York
Census-designated places in New York (state)
Hamlets in New York (state)
Census-designated places in Suffolk County, New York
Hamlets in Suffolk County, New York
Populated coastal places in New York (state)